Ciutulești is a commune in Florești District, Moldova. It is composed of four villages: Ciutulești, Ion Vodă, Mărinești and Sîrbești.

History
The chronicler Miron Costin (1633–1691) had a country seat here.

Notable people
 Sergiu Burcă
 Nicolae Casso (1839–1904) 
 Nicolae Negru
 Nicolae Timofti

External links
 Official site

References

Communes of Florești District